Teresa Carpio (born 30 September 1956) is a Hong Kong English- and Cantonese-language pop singer, actress, and singing teacher. Carpio was popular in Hong Kong during the 1970s and 1980s. She is the paternal cousin of actress and singer Rita Carpio, and also the mother of actress and singer T.V. Carpio. She is most well known for her Cantonese-language hits, 假如 (If), 仍然記得嗰一次 (I Still Remember That Time), 眉頭不再猛皺 (Sukiyaki), 何必放棄 (Why Give Up) and 真愛 (True Love).

Family background
Carpio was born in St. Teresa's Hospital in Ma Tau Wai, to a Filipino father and a Shanghainese mother. Born into a musical family (her grandfather was a concert violinist and jazz guitarist, her father Fernando, a jazz drummer, and several uncles were also professional musicians), she began singing at age 6 when she entered and won Hong Kong's first Amateur Talent Quest. She is the eldest of five, all of whom have at some time been active in the music business. Her eldest daughter, TV Carpio, is a musician, actress and Broadway singer.

Career
Carpio began her career as a child star, winning Hong Kong's first Amateur Talent Quest in 1963 at the age of 6. At age 11, she turned down a scholarship at St Paul's Convent to work in her first job in Tahiti where her father was also working. Following that, she worked in clubs until she went to Japan for a year where she met Shintaro Katsu who sponsored her during her time there. She released her first single in Japan in 1971, entitled Ainoko Mary (混血児マリー).

Returning to Hong Kong, she worked in many nightclubs, such as Danshaku, Gessekai and the Hyatt Hotel's Chin Chin Bar, until EMI came and offered her a recording deal.

For several years from 1975 onwards Carpio had her own TV variety show in Hong Kong, on which she performed both solo and with several of her siblings.  She released many albums in Hong Kong from 1976 onwards; six of her albums under EMI went gold, in which she featured cover versions in English of western hits, including an album with George Lam. She made numerous television appearances in Hong Kong, in the late 1970s.

Carpio was the first and the youngest Hong Kong singer ever to appear on national TV in Japan. She has performed in many other countries as far apart as Singapore, Malaysia, French Polynesia, Australia, Japan, Thailand, Brunei, the United States and Canada.

With the growing popularity of Cantopop, Carpio started to record in Cantonese along with English. In 1983, Carpio headlined the Hong Kong Coliseum for the first time. The concert was unsuccessful at the box office. Reception towards the concert was generally mixed: although Carpio's voice and stage presence was praised, the lack of Cantonese songs and audience interaction was criticised. According to Carpio, the concert caused her a lot of debt, partially leading to the dissolution of her first marriage.

She broadened her career into acting with appearances in a number of films, and auditioned for the lead role in Miss Saigon, though this eventually went to Lea Salonga. She was no stranger to live musical theatre, having taken the lead role in the 1979 San Jose, California production of the stage musical City of Broken Promises, based on the book by Austin Coates, a story set in Macau which won Best Original Musical.

Following her second marriage, Carpio moved to Canada and focused her attention on bringing up her family (she has three daughters, the eldest, T. V. Carpio, by her first marriage, also an actor, singer and songwriter).

Discography 
Carpio has released twenty five albums to date, including six live recordings. Her first eponymous studio album was released in 1975 and then quickly followed up with five more solo albums from EMI as well as a duet album with George Lam. In 1981 she moved to WEA and released one Cantonese-language album. In 1983 she formed her own record company, TV Records, which released three more Cantonese albums, on which – together with her WEA album – are some of her most popular songs. Since then she has released several live CDs and DVDs as well as a few studio recordings.

English

Cantonese

Duet

Live

Filmography 
She has appeared in 13 movies in total, starting in 1984 with a lead role in Happy Ghost, where she also sang the theme song. She is more well-known for her later movies, where she often was famous for small roles that became extremely popular, such as 2003's Truth or Dare: 6th Floor Rear Flat where she sang part of 海闊天空 (Boundless Oceans, Vast Skies), accompanying herself on keyboards.

Motion pictures

Teaching 
Carpio began teaching in 1991, when Sandy Lam came to her and asked her to teach her in preparation for her concerts at the Hong Kong Coliseum. After that, many other singers followed, such as Sammi Cheng, Wong Cho Lam, Cecilia Cheung, Joey Yung, Gigi Leung, Alex To, Edmund Leung, Twins, and Jade Kwan.

She appeared on Hong Kong television as a judge and head vocal coach on season two of the singing competition The Voice.

Major concerts

Singer 2017 
Prior to her appearance on Singer 2017, on 20 August 2016, she appeared as a guest singer on the finals of Crossover Singer 2016 for the performance of runner-up Wong Cho Lam (who sung a version of The Prayer.)

As a result of her appearance, Carpio was selected as one of eight initial singers to compete in Hunan TV's Singer 2017. During her tenure, she told to the media that her participation was fueled by the fact that she was competing against another Hong Kong singer, Sandy Lam Yik-Lin (who went on to win). Despite topping the singer's voting predictions (two 1st, one 2nd and one 3rd), she was eliminated on week five (2nd Knockout round) after receiving the lowest combined votes, largely due to finishing last on her prior week. Her elimination was not without controversy, with many fans questioning the elimination.

After her return performance on the week after elimination, Carpio later returned to the stage to participate the "Breakout Round", and at second place by a difference of three votes (0.15%) behind the top singer Li Jian. She was one of the few singers to be reinstated to the competition. However, she was shortly eliminated again on the semi-finals a week later as one of the bottom two singers (the other was Julia Peng), receiving a lower count of votes.

References

External links
Teresa Carpio, Asia's First Lady of Song – Official website; includes an incomplete discography

HK cinemagic entry

  	 

1956 births
Living people
Cantopop singers
EMI Records artists
English-language singers from Hong Kong
Hong Kong child singers
Hong Kong expatriates in Canada
Hong Kong expatriates in the United States
20th-century Hong Kong women singers
Hong Kong film actresses
Hong Kong people of Filipino descent
Hong Kong pianists
Hong Kong television personalities
Music educators
Hong Kong musical theatre actresses
Pop pianists
20th-century women pianists